d'Arras is a French surname. Notable people with the surname include:

Gautier d'Arras (died  1185), French poet
Jean d'Arras (14th century), French writer
Moniot d'Arras (13th century), French composer and poet

French-language surnames